was an American former professional baseball outfielder. A Nisei, he was born in Maui, Hawaii Territory, and played in Japan's Nippon Professional Baseball for the Yomiuri Giants and Kokutetsu Swallows. Miyamoto played one season of minor league baseball with the Hawaii Islanders of the Pacific Coast League in 1965, after he had retired from NPB.

He was married to the sister of former teammate Hirofumi Naito, the actress Kimiko Naito.

References

Bibliography

External links

1933 births
American baseball players of Japanese descent
American expatriate baseball players in Japan
Hawaii Islanders players
Kokutetsu Swallows players
Living people
Nippon Professional Baseball outfielders
People from Maui
Yomiuri Giants players